Hajji Kola (also Romanized as Ḩājjī Kolā) is a village in Hasan Reza Rural District, in the Central District of Juybar County, Mazandaran Province, Iran. At the 2006 census, its population was 157, in 44 families.

References 

Populated places in Juybar County